Tsing Yi Sports Ground is a sports ground in Tsing Yi, New Territories, Hong Kong. It is located near the east coast of the island, between Tivoli Garden and Tsing Yi Swimming Pool. It is the home of Hong Kong Premier League club Resources Capital.

The stadium consists of a Tartan track and a football pitch.

Opening hours
6:15 am to 10:30 pm every day. The pitch is closed for maintenance every Wednesday, however the track remains open for public use.

Gallery

References

External links
Facility Description with Schedule (LCSD.gov.hk) Updated Monthly

Tsing Yi
Sports venues in Hong Kong
Football venues in Hong Kong
2007 establishments in Hong Kong